The Fightin' Texas Aggie Band (also known as the Noble Men of Kyle or just the Aggie Band) is the official marching band of Texas A&M University. Composed of over 400 men and women from the school's Corps of Cadets, it is the largest military marching band in the world. The band's complex straight-line marching maneuvers are performed exclusively to traditional marches.

Since its inception in 1894, its members eat together, sleep in the same dormitories, and practice up to forty hours per week on top of a full academic schedule. The Aggie Band performs at all home football games, some away games, and university and Corps functions throughout the year. The band has also participated in inauguration parades for many United States Presidents and Texas Governors, major annual parades across the country, and the dedication ceremony for the George H. W. Bush Presidential Library.

History

Early years
The Aggie Band owes its existence to Joseph Holick (born in 1868 in Moravia). In 1885, Holick and his brother Louis boarded an empty boxcar bound for Orange, Texas so that they could gain employment in a lumber mill. En route, the two stopped in Bryan, Texas, near the campus of the Agricultural and Mechanical College of Texas. The 22-year-old Holick began to doubt his choice, stating, "I was a small boy and couldn't do lumbering work", and chose to remain in Bryan working under Raymond Blatherwick, owner of a prominent boot shop. Lawrence Sullivan Ross, the president of the nearby college and a former Governor of Texas, stopped into Blatherwick's boot shop and noted how inconvenient it was for cadets to go to Bryan for their boots. Ross requested Holick be stationed at the new military college to perform cobbler duties.

Holick accepted the proposal and moved to work at Texas A&M. Shortly after his arrival, the Commandant's staff discovered his musical talents. They requested him to play the bugle for Corps functions and for US$65 a month, he was assigned to play Reveille and Taps. Because the new job paid much more than his previous one, Holick wanted to give the school "more than just two tunes for its money and he asked the commandant for permission to start a cadet band". The commandant agreed and named Holick its first bandmaster. Under his tutelage and the leadership of subsequent bandmasters, the band grew from 13 members at its inception in 1894 to 75 bandsmen in 1924.

Early drum majors are credited with inspiring the band's name. The first student drum major, H.A. "California" Morse, was asked to leave the college due to fighting. In addition, the early drum majors were chosen in physical combat; insomuch that the candidates were placed in a locked room, with the best fighter / the one emerging victorious, being named to the coveted position. This tradition of aggressiveness and physical combat was noted by band members, who then took to calling themselves the Fightin' Texas Aggie Band.

Dunn years

In 1924, Lieutenant Colonel Richard J. Dunn was appointed as bandmaster. As a former member of John Philip Sousa's Marine Band and with 26 years of military band leadership experience, Dunn quickly instituted changes within the band. The first was to the position of bugler, whose duties had fallen to the bandmaster since 1894. When informed that he was expected to fill the role, Dunn told college officials, "I have blown enough bugles. I am the Bandmaster. Someone else can blow the bugle calls." From then on, the Corps Bugler was chosen from the ranks of the Aggie Band.

Dunn also instituted uniform changes which added white canvas to the band uniform, resulting in a "flash effect" every other step. Dunn tried, to no avail, to rid the band of the Senior Boots, but this tradition was too well-established. Other additions included crossed white belts, later discarded in favor of a white Sam Browne belt, silver buckles, and the addition of a bugle rank to lead the band in its maneuvers. Changes in the drills included the "Block T", the band's signature, and such intricate designs which led to talk amongst fans about the band "always winning halftime".

Under Dunn's experience, the band instituted some traditions that the university uses to the present. In 1925, Marvin H. Mimms wrote the lyrics for an alma mater for the school. Dunn, who found the Aggie War Hymn "inappropriate" for social functions and solemn occasions, wrote its accompanying music and presented it to the student body titled Spirit of Aggieland. In 1926, the tradition of Elephant Walk began when two seniors in the band led a procession of seniors throughout the school grounds visiting all the important places on campus. All the seniors in one single file was "quite a sight to behold", and one junior commented that they looked like a bunch of old elephants wandering around trying to find some place to die. The name stuck and the tradition continues to the present.

Beginning in 1939, the U.S. Army required all cadets to be in either infantry or field artillery units. Therefore, the band was split into two separate units at opposite ends of the campus dormitories and named Infantry and Artillery Bands. When the two units performed together, they formed the Combined Band. 1942 saw the band expand to 250 members, but the need for manpower for the war effort caused membership to plummet. By the end of the 1942–1943 school year, it dropped it to only 90 bandsmen. As "a crusty old army man", Dunn understood the nation's urgent need for troops, and he accepted the fact that the Aggie Band could only return after the war was over.

Along with conducting the Aggie Band, Dunn started his own orchestra with the newly built A&M Consolidated High School on the Texas A&M Campus, called the "Little Symphony Orchestra". Dunn was also the founder of the famous A&M Consolidated High School Tiger Band in 1947.

Adams era

Dunn once told then-cadet Edward Vergne Adams, "One day I want you to direct this band." Adams thought the Colonel was joking, but "went to music school after graduation just in case he wasn't". After music school, he joined the army and put his musical skills to rest for the duration of the war, with one exception: while on regimental staff during the retreat ceremony at the end of the day, the assigned bugler had no experience and couldn't play a single note, so Adams stepped out of formation, took the bugle from the bugler's hands, blew the appropriate calls, handed the bugle back, and marched back into his spot in the formation.

This intolerance for incompetence served him well when he accepted the invitation of Dunn to be his replacement as director of the Aggie Band. Adams began his tenure with an undisciplined band devoid of experience and ravaged by years of war, but in his first year of leadership, the ranks of the band quickly swelled to 225 members. Infantry and field artillery associations were no longer required by the Army and Adams changed the units' names to the Maroon and White Bands.

Adams began to make the drills far more intricate and precise than they had been in the past by adding a countermarch, maneuvers from the Army Drill Manual, and established a 30-inch (76 cm) step, or six steps for every five yards (4.57m), as the band standard. Adams also added the criss-cross maneuver. First performed November 27, 1947 at the annual Thanksgiving Day game with the University of Texas, the criss-cross maneuver and its later variations (specifically the four-way cross) became the band's most anticipated maneuver. Other band directors said it was impossible to do because it required two people to be in the same place at the same time (indeed, to this day computer programs that chart band formations say that this maneuver cannot be performed). To accomplish this, band members step between each other's feet. In later years, people who did not know that the maneuver was first done in 1947 claimed that the drill was designed by a computer. Adams explained, "It's all a matter of mathematics. One man can take up only a certain amount of space at one time and moves in one direction at a predictable rate of speed."

The band's reputation spread and other bands had begun to have some apprehension about performing in the same halftime as the Aggie Band. One Southwest Conference band director stated, "I dread going against the Aggie Band.... What is so humiliating is to see the Aggie Band do things band directors talk about as being impossible, and do them perfectly. It takes two weeks to recover from the trauma." In 1960, "one band gave up without a fight": the Trinity Tiger Band opted to sit instead of perform and gave the Aggie Band the entire halftime to perform.

During Adams' tenure, the college acquired a new mascot, the first since the original Reveille died in 1944. Reveille II, like the original Reveille, was cared for and attended to by band members. During halftime performances, the young dog was allowed to be on the field with the band without her leash. During these breaks where she could get out and run, she had a tendency to "do her business" on Kyle Field's playing surface. This didn't bother the band members much, as Reveille stayed away from the band, but Adams discovered a gambling scheme whereby cadets were taking bets on what yard line the dog would defecate. He quickly ended the practice and turned the responsibility of caring for Reveille over to Company E-2, which has since been called the Mascot Company.

On October 7, 1967, the first meeting of the Aggie Band Association took place to support the band. The organization, composed of former members and supporters, continue to assist the band through fundraising, scholarships, instrument repair, and general welfare of the cadets in the band. In 1970, Adams acquired funds and built a new band hall which was named in his honor.

Modernization and expansion

Colonel Joe T. Haney took over the band in 1973. He felt his obligation was, "not to build up the band ... [but] to keep it at its already exceptional level". During Haney's years, the band expanded to include a concert band, a symphonic band, the Aggieland Orchestra, and a Drum and Bugle Corps, and the names of the two subunits reverted to their earlier designations of Infantry and Artillery Bands.

This simple philosophy was tested as Texas A&M transitioned from an all-male military college to a coeducational research university. The addition of women to the Corps presented some challenges, including one high-profile lawsuit and fierce resistance from former Corps and Band members. When women were finally admitted to the band under court order (Fall Semester, 1985); the first three women had to be housed in a separate dorm until accommodations could be made within the band dorms. Reporters were relentless and Haney finally called an open press conference with the three young ladies. The female cadets refused pictures unless their fish buddies (members of their freshman class in their unit) were included in the photos. With a band dropout rate of 33% the odds were against all of the female cadets succeeding, only Andrea Abat remained in the band through her senior year. Haney realized the separate living conditions were not conducive to good order and discipline and integrated the dorms, grouping females at one end of the dorm and designating one bathroom for exclusive female use.

Amidst these drastic changes, large proportions of the freshmen classes (some as high as 30%) contained all-state high school band members. As the band's experience and musical talents grew, the quality of the music improved dramatically. Haney even rewrote the drills to include a portion where the band stopped moving and played to the audience. This innovation was well received and became a staple of the band's repertoire. In 1975, at a televised game versus the University of Arkansas, the Aggie Band was repeatedly asked to play music during lulls in the game. By the fourth quarter, the Aggie Band had played on TV during every break and Colonel Haney, trying his best to be fair, told the cameraman that they really should let the Razorback Band play a little too. The cameraman called up to the broadcast booth to get guidance and then replied, "The director doesn't want to hear the Arkansas band, he wants to hear the Aggie Band."

The drills became even more complicated as Haney added formations and maneuvers never before seen. The excellence shown on the field belied its heavy dependence on precision. On October 24, 1981, the band suffered a serious misstep during the halftime show at Rice University when four members of a lead element turned early and, before anyone could make a correction, colliding band members ground the drill to a halt. With so many members doing exactly what the person in front of them does with mere inches of clearance, the cascade effect was unrecoverable and the band simply stopped and left the field.  Although it was first rumored that the collision was intended to mock the Rice Marching Owl Band, and later that
Rice students were using whistles to throw off the band's response to drum major whistle commands, all of the rumors proved to be unsubstantiated.  Thereafter the band performed all drills in Houston without whistle commands.

The following weekend the band attempted their most complicated drill and performed flawlessly. Each subsequent week, the drills became more complicated. The Bryan-College Station Eagle's editor opined, "A&M is probably the only school anywhere that throws in a free football game with its performance. One of these days, I fully expect the band to be invited to a bowl game—and to be told it can bring along its football team if it wants to."

Into a new millennium

Lieutenant Colonel Ray E. Toler, a Texas Christian University graduate, replaced Haney when he stepped down in 1989. As a veteran of many Air Force Bands and with a Grammy Award nomination under his belt, Toler was quick to realize the potential and traditions of the Aggie Band and quickly set about publicizing it. Under his direction, the Aggie Band began a weekly television show (the "Texas Aggie Band Show") that showcased the band, the Corps of Cadets, and the daily life of a band member. As of 2007, the Aggie Band is the only university or college band with its own weekly television show. The Aggie Band was recognized nationally as the 2001 recipient of the Louis Sudler Trophy for collegiate marching bands, administered by the John Philip Sousa Foundation. During Toler's leadership of the Aggie Band, its presence was personally requested by President-elect George W. Bush for his inauguration parade.

During Toler's tenure, many of the drills were written by Colonel Jay Brewer who also served as the announcer for over 30 years until his retirement in 2020. In addition, many of the Aggie drills and music were written by Dr. Timothy Rhea, who succeeded Toler as Director of Bands in 2002.  Rhea actively arranges and composes music, which has been published by TRN Music Publisher, RBC Music Publisher, and Arranger's Publishing Company. In the 2012–2013 school year, members of the band were first allowed to join the Fish Drill Team. After the 2018–2019 school year, the Aggie Band ceased using the Adams Band Hall and Haney Drill Field, in preparation for its move to the new Music Activities Center (MAC). This facility considerably increases rehearsal space for the band and includes a turf drill field, which is not susceptible to the ruts and holes often created on Haney due to constant marching. The move to the MAC requires the Aggie Band to vacate its traditional dormitories – Dorms 9 and 11, the latter of which was custom-built for the band in 1939 – in favor of dormitories closer to the new facility. The Haney Drill Field was used by the Aggie Band for approximately 75 years. The Fish Drill Team still uses Haney Drill Field for most practices.

On December 6, 2018, a select contingent of the Aggie Band performed at the burial of U.S. President George H. W. Bush on the Texas A&M campus. The band played the presidential salute "Hail to the Chief" and the "Texas Aggie War Hymn" as Bush's casket was removed from the funeral train. Although a United States Air Force band performed "The Star-Spangled Banner" as Bush's casket arrived at the burial site, they did not play "Hail to the Chief," making the Aggie Band's performance the last time the late president was saluted with this piece.

Directors and band staff
The band is under the oversight of the director of bands at Texas A&M University, currently Dr. Timothy Rhea, who coordinates the band.

List of directors of bands
Joseph Holick (1894)
Arthur Jenkins (1895)
George W. Gross (1895–1897)
F. H. Miller (1897–1902)
George W. Terrell (1902–1904)
Bradford Pier Day (1904–1917)
Alois Slovacek (1918–1919)
Howell Nolte (1920)
George Farleigh (1920–1924)
Richard J. Dunn (1924–1946)
E. V. Adams (1946–1973)
Joe T. Haney (1973–1989)
Lieutenant Colonel Ray E. Toler (1989–2002)
Colonel Timothy Rhea (2002–present)

Associate Directors
Joe T. Haney (1972–1973)
Major Joe K. McMullen
Bill J. Dean (1982–1988)
Lieutenant Colonel Ray E. Toler (1988–1989)
Colonel Jay O. Brewer (1989–2020)
Major Travis Almany (2004–present)
Captain Russell Tipton (2016–present)
Dr. Lance Sample (2021–present)

Assistant Directors
Captain Jay O. Brewer (1986–1989)
Jim McDaniel (1990–1993)
Lieutenant Timothy Rhea (1992–2001)

Cadet life

The Aggie Band is unique among college bands; no other band eats and lives together as a military unit, even at the Service Academies and military colleges. Bandsmen wear their cadet uniforms to class, drill, meetings, and other functions on campus. As a requested component of football away games, they perform at more football games than any other band. As of 1993, the band performed at 125 of the last 131 football games, including a streak of 42 straight from 1981 to 1984. Demand is extremely high for the band and one person, upon finding out the Aggie Band would not be performing at the local football game versus A&M, returned and requested a refund for 40 tickets.

The Aggie Band performs a new show each week during the football season and does not generally repeat drills from week to week. During the fall semester, the Aggie Band practices for 90 minutes every weekday morning and on Saturdays every week with a football game. In addition, some components of the band also practice on Sunday afternoons and planning of the drills takes place throughout the fall semester. All told, drills can take eight to nine hours per week on top of a full academic schedule and Corps/ROTC activities.

All seniors in the Corps of Cadets wear distinctive cavalry riding boots with their uniforms. These boots usually cost more than $1,800 and are generally made at Holick's, formerly owned by the family of Joseph Holick, the first band director.

Organization 
The members of the band are called BQs and, since the band's inception, are part of the Corps of Cadets. The Aggie Band is a major unit in the Corps, comparable in size to a brigade or wing. Unique among Corps units, however, the band is divided into two battalions of three "outfits" each, the Infantry Band and the Artillery Band. All BQs are assigned to one of the six outfits. Each battalion is commanded by a Cadet Lieutenant Colonel and has its own command staff; each outfit is commanded by a Cadet Major. Outfits are further divided into platoons, squads, and fire teams, led by a Cadet Captain, Cadet Staff Sergeant, and Cadet Corporal, respectively. Due to its status as a Senior Military College, all cadets are required to take ROTC classes at least their first two years, though follow-on military service is not required.

From 1948, the Maroon and White Bands functioned as single outfits, with the band as a whole functioning as an independent battalion. When the Infantry and Artillery Bands were reestablished in 1976, they were divided into two outfits each: A-Company and B-Company in the Infantry Band, and A-Battery and B-Battery in the Artillery Band. C-Company and C-Battery existed briefly from 1983 to 1984, then were permanently reactivated in 2013.

Leadership
Unlike many bands, the drum majors are not in charge of the band as a whole. Since the band is part of the Corps, it has its own unit commander, a Cadet Colonel.  Due to necessity for military functions, the Band Commander is accorded the privilege of the first file in bugle rank (the lead rank of the band).  During formal military ceremonies, the commander carries a sabre instead of a bugle, as do all other commanders. The Infantry and Artillery Bands perform together for halftime shows, but are often split for minor performances such as local parades and functions where the entire band is not needed. Furthermore, the band is composed of three different ROTC programs and appoints commanders to manage and train the cadets within their respective ROTC affiliations.

On the field, the band is led by three drum majors and the twelve members of bugle rank. Each drum major carries a mace and directs the band based on its movements and whistle commands during a drill. The head drum major is a Cadet Lieutenant Colonel, while the two side drum majors, the Infantry Band Drum Major and the Artillery Band Drum Major, are Cadet Majors.

Bugle rank consists of the Band Commander and eleven other senior cadets who are well respected in the band and have impeccable marching abilities. Each bugle rank member carries a bugle with a banner, which are never played during a performance. Together, the drum majors and bugle rank lead the band through the maneuvers on the field. In addition to their primary functions within the band, the bugles and maces also serve a military ceremonial function and are used to salute commissioned officers, much as a rifleman would salute with a rifle or a commander would salute with a sabre.

Composition
The band has over 400 members, though as of 2019, a typical performance fields slightly over 300 bandsmen. Instrumentation consists of more than 60 trumpets, 40 trombones, 30 mellophones, 30 baritones, 25 bass horns, 40 drummers, and 90 assorted woodwinds, though the actual composition varies annually. There are no flutes in the Aggie Band, as their position while being played would hinder the intricate marching maneuvers. Piccolos are used instead. All members of the band must have high school marching experience, an audition during the spring semester leading into the first fall semester of attendance to include major scales and sight reading, and an individual interview with the band director.  Prospective members are also encouraged to participate in the Spend the Night with the Corps program to better understand the rigors of life in the Corps of Cadets.

Marching

Complex maneuvers

The repertoire of the Aggie Band's maneuvers is designed by the directors and drum majors and can include obliques, flanks, countermarches, and other Army marching maneuvers. The Band is generally led by the bugle rank with each person following the person in front of them, also known as follow-the-leader. Space between band members during countermarches is less than six inches (15 cm)  and during other maneuvers even less. This space is insufficient for the bass horns and some members must turn their horns to complete the maneuver. According to an article in The Battalion, "some of the Aggie band's maneuvers are so complex that some drill-charting software says that the drills are impossible because they require multiple people to be in the same place at the same time."  This is also discussed in a video by The Association of Former Students of Texas A&M University.

The Fightin' Texas Aggie Band has performed at inauguration parades for many Presidents of the United States in Washington, D.C., including at the personal request of President-elect George H. W. Bush.
Other events in which the band has participated include inauguration parades for Governors of Texas, major annual parades across the country, and the dedication ceremony for the George H. W. Bush Presidential Library.

Typical halftime drill

The halftime drill always begins with the band running into place at the command of the drum major's whistle. The announcer, an associate band director, then states, usually the crowd in unison with him says, "Ladies and gentlemen, now forming at the north end of Kyle Field, the nationally famous Fightin' Texas Aggie Band." A whoop and cheers come from the audience. The drum majors then march out in front of the band and the head drum major calls the band to attention and vocally gives directions to the band, referencing the composition of the Aggie War Hymn, by shouting, "Recall! Step off on Hullabaloo!" (Recall is a traditional Army bugle call – the first 34 notes, and intro of the Aggie War Hymn. "Hullabaloo" is the first word sung in the Aggie War Hymn.) These directions are not amplified in any way, but can be heard across the entire stadium. After another whoop, the drum majors signal for the horns to be lifted into playing position with two quick whistle blasts and the bugle rank does a flourish.

The drill then begins with the band playing the opening notes of the War Hymn and stepping off into the initial formation. At some point in the drill, the band converts from Spread formation to Block formation. With no cessation of the music until the band leaves the field, the drill continues and often stops with the band playing the last stanza in place in the center of the field before moving into the signature "Block T" or "Block ATM". When done playing, the band runs off the field. Specific maneuvers in the drill can include:

 The Criss Cross: the band files split into two halves and march through each other at 90° angles
 The Four-way Cross: The band splits into four groups of three files and march through each other from each of the corners of the field (this maneuver is one of the more popular among fans, due to its difficulty)
 Minstrel Turns: band members pass through each other by stepping between each other's feet.
 Spread-to-Block: the band moves from being 30 files wide (i.e., across the width of the football field) by 12 ranks deep (i.e., along the length of the football field) to 12 files wide by 30 ranks deep
 Block-to-Spread: the opposite of Spread-to-Block
 Continuous Countermarch: the bugle rank leads two successive countermarches following the back of the band through the maneuver
 Wheel Turns (also known as a Gate Turn): A turn of a block of the band where the people on the inside of the turn reduce their step size. This is only done during parades when going around corners.

Music
As a military marching band, the Aggie Band exclusively plays traditional marches. Among many other marches, its primary repertoire includes:

 Fightin' Texas Aggie War Hymn

 Spirit of Aggieland: The school's alma mater
 The Noble Men of Kyle: The group's signature march; also a nickname for the band
 Ballad of the Green Berets
 The main theme from the movie Patton
 When Johnny Comes Marching Home
 Strategic Air Command March

The Aggie Band frequently performs a number of standard military and circus marches:

 The Trombone King (King)
 Stars and Stripes Forever (Sousa)
 Bravura (Duble)
 National Emblem (Bagley)
 Them Basses (Huffine)
 Washington Post (Sousa)
 Armed Forces Medley (Traditional)
 St. Julien (Hughes)
 Semper Fidelis (Sousa)
 Americans We (Fillmore)
 Pentland Hills (Howe)
 Klaxon (Fillmore)
Many non-military works are also commonly played by the band, arranged as marches by Dr. Rhea. These include movie themes (Theme from 1941, Parade of the Charioteers, The Good, the Bad and the Ugly), concert marches (The Sinfonians, Bird’s Battlin’ Brigade, Pomp and Circumstance Marches), and even symphonic and orchestral music ("Cathedral Chorus" from Russian Christmas Music, Great Gate of Kiev).

Notable members
General Eric Smith, 36th assistant commandant of the Marine Corps and commander of the combined band (1986-1987)
General Joe Ramirez, Commandant of the Texas A&M Corps of Cadets (2011-2021).

See also
 United States military bands
 Highty-Tighties
 Texas A&M Singing Cadets
 Texas A&M University Century Singers
 Texas A&M Wind Symphony

References

External links

 Texas A&M University Bands

American military bands
Southeastern Conference marching bands
Musical groups established in 1894
Musical groups from Texas
Band
Band
1894 establishments in Texas